A code of conduct is a set of rules outlining the norms, rules, and responsibilities or proper practices of an individual party or an organization.

Companies' codes of conduct

A company code of conduct is a set of rules which is commonly written for employees of a company, which protects the business and informs the employees of the company's expectations. It is appropriate for even the smallest of companies to create a document containing important information on expectations for employees. The document does not need to be complex or have elaborate policies.

Failure of an employee to follow a company's code of conduct can have negative consequences.  In Morgan Stanley v. Skowron, 989 F. Supp. 2d 356 (S.D.N.Y. 2013), applying New York's faithless servant doctrine, the court held that a hedge fund's employee engaging in insider trading in violation of his company's code of conduct, which also required him to report his misconduct, must repay his employer the full $31 million his employer paid him as compensation during his period of faithlessness.

Accountants' code of conduct
In its 2007 International Good Practice Guidance, "Defining and Developing an Effective Code of Conduct for Organizations", provided the following working definition: "Principles, values, standards, or rules of behaviour that guide the decisions, procedures, and systems of an organization in a way that (a) contributes to the welfare of its key stakeholders, and (b) respects the rights of all constituents affected by its operations."

Codes of conduct in practice
A code of conduct can be an important part in establishing an inclusive culture, but it is not a comprehensive solution on its own.  An ethical culture is created by the organization's leaders who manifest their ethics in their attitudes and behaviour. Studies of codes of conduct in the private sector show that their effective implementation must be part of a learning process that requires training, consistent enforcement, and continuous measurement/improvement: simply requiring members to read the code is not enough to ensure that they understand it and will remember its contents. Castellano et al. describe Tom Morris' book If Aristotle Ran General Motors as "compelling" and "persuasive" in arguing that in addition to codes of conduct and ethical guidelines, the creation of an ethical workplace climate requires "socially harmonious relationships" to be embedded in practice. The proof of effectiveness is when employees/members feel comfortable enough to voice concerns and believe that the organization will respond with appropriate action.

Examples 

 Banking Code
 Bushido
 Code of Conduct for the International Red Cross and Red Crescent Movement and NGOs in Disaster Relief
 Code of Hammurabi
 Code of the United States Fighting Force
 Code of Service Discipline
 Declaration of Geneva
 Declaration of Helsinki
 Don't be evil
 Eight precepts
 Election Commission of India's Model Code of Conduct
 Five Pillars of Islam
 Golden Rule
 Geneva Conventions
 Hippocratic Oath
 ICC Cricket Code of Conduct
 International Code of Conduct against Ballistic Missile Proliferation (ICOC or Hague Code of Conduct)
 Journalist's Creed
 Kapu
 Moral Code of the Builder of Communism
 Pāṭimokkha
 Pirate code
 Rule of Saint Benedict
 Ten Commandments
 Ten precepts (Taoism)
 Uniform Code of Military Justice
 Vienna Convention on Diplomatic Relations

See also
 Programming ethics

References

External links

 
Applied ethics
Morality
Political charters
Rules